The Australian Laureate Fellowship is an Australian professorial research fellowship awarded by the Australian Research Council. Up to 17 fellows are chosen each year for five-year awards.

Kathleen Fitzpatrick and Georgina Sweet fellowships
In 2010, the Australian Research Council created the Kathleen Fitzpatrick and Georgina Sweet Australian Laureate Fellowships. The Kathleen Fitzpatrick fellowship is named for Kathleen Fitzpatrick and honours a woman candidate in a humanities field. The Georgina Sweet fellowship is named for Georgina Sweet and honours a woman in a science or technology discipline. In addition to the funding from the standard Australian laureate fellowship, both of these named fellowships include an additional $20,000 per year to promote women in research.

Recipients

2022

2021

2020

2019

2018

2017

2016

2015

2014

2013

2012

2011

2010

2009

References

External links 
Australian Laureate Fellowships at the Australian Research Council
Kathleen Fitzpatrick and Georgina Sweet Australian Laureate Fellowships
Australian Research Council grants database

Research in Australia
Career awards
Faculty awards